Sarawak United Football Club, or  Sarawak United FC, is a Malaysian professional football club based in Sarawak. The club currently plays in the second division, the Malaysia M3 League, after being ejected from Malaysia Super League.

History
Founded in 1974 as the Malaysia Malays' Football Association football team, the club changed its name to Selangor Malays' Football Association football team when competing in the 2017 Malaysia FAM League season. They were rebranded again as Selangor United for the 2018 Malaysia FAM Cup season. Unfortunately, Selangor United did not last long in the game as the team faced financial difficulties. In 2019, the club was bought over by the FAS and the new owners subsequently rebranded the club as Sarawak United. 
 
With FAS buying and rebranding the team, the move was a win-win situation for FAS, because thanks to the move, FAS has made sure that a team representing the Malaysian state of Sarawak is playing in the 2020 Malaysia Premier League. All that happened after the main football team run by FAS to compete in the Malaysia Premier League at the time, known as the Sarawak FA state football team, were relegated to the Malaysian third-tier division, the Malaysia M3 League in 2019. In 2020, the Malaysia Premier League however saw the participation of two Sarawak-based football clubs with  Kuching City being promoted to the Malaysia Premier League that year.

2016 season
 Malaysia Malays' Football Association (MMFA) entered the Malaysian football league competition in 2016 season.
 The team is managed by the Selangor Malays' Football Association, an affiliate of Malaysia Malays' Football Association. The team finished 2016 season in seventh place.

2017 season
 Starting from 2017 season, the team has been rebranded to Selangor Malays' Football Association as an effort to bring in local area support. The club has managed advanced to second round of 2017 Malaysia FA Cup after defeating SAMB.
 However, they were knocked out from the tournament after a defeat of 0-3 against Perak.

2018 season
 They were re-branded again as Selangor United in 2018. The club succeeded in winning the semi-final in the knock-out stage of the 2018 Malaysia FAM Cup, and were promoted to Premier League as finalists, even though they were beaten in the final 0-2 by Terengganu City.

2019 season
 The club made their debut into professional football for the 2019 Malaysia Premier League, the second-tier professional football league in Malaysia. They finished 9th in the league by the end of the season.
 In the December 2019, the club were bought over by the Football Association of Sarawak (FAS) after the Selangor Malays Football Association stop receiving fund from the Selangor State government and were forced to get rid of the team.

New Era

2020 season

The 2020 season was Sarawak United's 1st year in their history and also first season in the Malaysia Premier League. Along with the league, the club also participated in the Malaysia FA Cup but was cancelled due to COVID-19 pandemic. On 13 March, it was announced that the 2020 Malaysia Premier League would be suspended indefinitely, due to the ongoing COVID-19 pandemic. On 1 May, it was announced that the league would resume in September dependent on the situation at the time. Due to time constraints, the home-and-away format for the Premier League has been scrapped. Teams played each other only once. Sarawak United FC finished their 2020 Malaysia Premier League campaign with 3 Win, 2 Draw and 6 Loss after 11 match.

2021 season

For the 2021 season the club was strengthened with several well -known players. Among them are Malaysian National player, Norshahrul Idlan and Australian National player, Taylor Regan. The club seen as strong in every position and was selected as the team of choice to be a Champion of 2021 Malaysia Premier League. Sarawak United started the 2021 Malaysia Premier League campaign with a 2-0 victory over Kelantan United. For the 2021 season, Sarawak United team is also the most difficult team to beat by the opposing team. Sarawak United's fort is controlled by an experienced Goalkeeper, Sharbinee Allawee which is not easy to beat. Imported striker from Nigeria, Uche Agba , on the other hand, emerged as the top scorer for Sarawak United. 

After 17 matches in the Malaysian Premier League 2021 have been played, Sarawak United was officially promoted and eligible to play in the highest tier of the Malaysian Football League, the 2022 Malaysia Super League.

2022 season

Sarawak United was rejected from Malaysia Super League and relegation to M3 League from 2023 season.

Crest and colours
Since the club's foundation in 1974, the club have had five main crests. The first, adopted when the team was founded, its backgrounds colours of the club crest were green and red. For the 2021 Malaysia Premier League season, the team's outfield players wear black shirts, red shorts and red socks for the club's home matches.

Crest
Sarawak United uses a crest which was seen as a modified version of the Football Association of Sarawak  (FAS) crest for the 2020 Malaysia Premier League season. However, in 2021, Sarawak United changed the team's crest to the current one which was more reflective of the ethnic characteristics of Sarawak although the Golden Hornbill remains the team's symbol of choice.

Kit manufacturers

Stadium and locations

Players

First-team Squad

 (Captain)

Season-by-season records

Club records (Since 2020 Era)
 
Note:
 
Pld = Played, W = Won, D = Drawn, L = Lost, F = Goals for, A = Goals against, D = Goal difference, Pts= Points, Pos = Position

Club top scorer (since 2020 era)

Foreign players (Since 2020 Era)

Managers/Head Coach

Managers/Head Coach (Since 2020 Era)

Development squads

U21 squad

U19 squad

Management team

Club personnel

Honours

Domestic

League

Malaysia FAM League
 Runners-up (1): 2018

 Malaysia Premier League
 Runners-up (1): 2021

References

External links
 Sarawak Football News site
 Official Sarawak United site

 
Malaysia FAM League clubs
Malaysia Premier League clubs
Football clubs in Malaysia